All Balls Don't Bounce is the debut studio album by American rapper Aceyalone. It was released in 1995 on Capitol Records. In 2004, it was re-released on Project Blowed and Decon as All Balls Don't Bounce: Revisited with a bonus disc. It was named by OC Weekly as one of the "Five Classic West Coast Rap Albums Turning 20 in 2015".

Critical reception

Writing for The Austin Chronicle, Rashied Gabriel thought that the album's production and Aceylone's "various styles" worked to complementary effect. He went on to label All Balls Don't Bounce "a sureshot record", and felt that it delivered "verbal calisthenics that astound with fresh insight as well as lyrical wizardry." Robert Christgau gave it a "neither" rating, indicating that an album "may impress once or twice with consistent craft or an arresting track or two. Then it won't."

In a retrospective review, Steve Huey of AllMusic gave the album 5 stars out of 5, describing Aceyalone as "one of the greatest lyricists the West Coast has ever produced, twisting his fluid rhymes around and off the beat with the improvisational assurance of Rakim." He also commented that "[the production] is solid if unspectacular, usually spare and jazzy, with lots of piano/keyboard samples and some fitting nods to the abstract side of hard bop."

Track listing

References

External links
 

1995 debut albums
Aceyalone albums
Capitol Records albums